Play with Me is a 1955 picture book written and illustrated by Marie Hall Ets. The book tells the story of a girl who attempts to play in a meadow with animals. The book was a recipient of a 1956 Caldecott Honor for its illustrations.

References

1955 children's books
American picture books
Caldecott Honor-winning works